Angulomyces is a genus of fungi belonging to the family Angulomycetaceae.

The species of this genus are found in Northern America.

Species:
 Angulomyces argentinensis Letcher

References

Chytridiomycota
Chytridiomycota genera